Aristolochene is a bicyclic sesquiterpene produced by certain fungi including the cheese mold Penicillium roqueforti.  It is biosynthesized from farnesyl pyrophosphate by aristolochene synthase and is the parent hydrocarbon of a large variety of fungal toxins.

The substance was first isolated from Penicillium roqueforti, a fungus used to make blue cheeses like Roquefort, Danish Blue, Stilton cheese and gorgonzola.

Aristolochene is a precursor to PR toxin, a toxic chemical made in large amounts by Penicillium roqueforti. PR toxin has been implicated in incidents of mycotoxicoses resulting from eating contaminated grains.

Related Compounds 
 Roquefortine C
 Aflatoxin
 Patulin

References

Sesquiterpenes
Mycotoxins
Bicyclic compounds
Hydrocarbons
Isopropenyl compounds